The Blueshirts (Spanish: Camisas Azules) were the Falangist paramilitary militia in Spain. The name refers to the blue uniform worn by members of the militia. The colour blue was chosen for the uniforms in 1934 by the FE de las JONS because it was, according to José Antonio Primo de Rivera, "clear, whole, and proletarian," and is the colour typically worn by workers, as the Falange sought to gain support among the Spanish working class. In Francoist Spain the Blueshirts were officially reorganized and officially renamed the Falange Militia of the FET y de las JONS in 1940.

References 

Fascist organizations
Anti-communist organizations
Government paramilitary forces
Military wings of fascist parties
Military units and formations of the Cold War
Paramilitary organisations based in Spain
Political repression in Spain
Clothing in politics
Francoist Spain
Falangism
Political organisations based in Spain